Stanford Everett Morse Jr. (May 31, 1926 – February 28, 2002), was a Mississippi lawyer who served two terms in the Mississippi State Senate. Initially a Democrat, Morse became a Republican in 1963 as part of an unsuccessful candidacy for the office of Lieutenant Governor of Mississippi.

See also

 List of American politicians who switched parties in office

References

1926 births
2002 deaths
People from Gulfport, Mississippi
Mississippi lawyers
Mississippi state senators
Mississippi Democrats
Mississippi Republicans
University of Mississippi alumni
University of Mississippi School of Law alumni
20th-century American politicians
20th-century American lawyers